Symphony Park is a 61-acre site located in downtown Las Vegas. Once housing a Union Pacific rail yard, Symphony Park is being master developed for mixed-use by the city of Las Vegas, which is also the landowner. Symphony Park is home to the Cleveland Clinic Lou Ruvo Center for Brain Health, Smith Center for the Performing Arts and the Discovery Children's Museum.

Overview
Notable features of Symphony Parks include:
 Cleveland Clinic Lou Ruvo Center for Brain Health, an institution dedicated to researching and finding cures for brain-related diseases.
 Smith Center for the Performing Arts, offering a blend of performances including dance, music and Broadway shows. It is home to resident companies, Nevada Ballet Theater and the Las Vegas Philharmonic Orchestra, and also houses the Las Vegas Metro Chamber of Commerce. The Smith Center includes a 2,050-seat main hall, a 300-seat Cabaret Jazz club that overlooks a park and the 200-seat Troesh Studio Theatre.
 Discovery Children's Museum, a three-story facility focusing on science and nature, art and culture, and early childhood development with 26,000 square feet of interactive, hands-on exhibits. The museum includes nine interactive galleries featuring traveling exhibitions, daily programs, demonstrations and cultural programming.

Symphony Park's neighbors include the 5.1-million-square-foot World Market Center Las Vegas, the 175-store Las Vegas North Premium Outlets and the multistory Clark County Government Center.

Symphony Park is the only project in the state of Nevada to be accepted into a national pilot program for green neighborhood developments. Symphony Park was awarded gold certification under stage 2 of the U.S. Green Building Council’s Leadership in Energy and Environmental Design for Neighborhood Development. (LEED®-ND)

History

Early timeline

July 19, 2000  City Council authorizes City staff to enter into negotiations with Shopco Advisory Group (representing Lehman Brothers) for the purchase of the 61-acre parcel; City willing to exchange 98 acres in the Las Vegas Technology Center plus $2 million.

September 25, 2000  Environmental Risk Management Report completed by Converse Consultants.

October 4, 2000  City Council holds the agreement that allows the City to exchange 99 acres in the Las Vegas Technology Park plus $2 million for the 61.5 acres.

October 18, 2000  City Council approves the agreement between PAMI and the City of Las Vegas for the acquisition of the 61.5-acre parcel located at Grand Central Parkway 
and Bonneville.

September 2001  Risk-Based Evaluation completed – Converse Consultants; after completion of the market analysis, second risk-based evaluation completed to determine 
extent of future remediation requirements for proposed uses of hospital, residential and retail.

January 2003  City Council approves City Parkway to act as master developer.

2004  The project, frequently referred to as the "61 acres", is officially named Union Park.

January 2005  Mayor announces gift of land on site to Ruvo for Alzheimer's Clinic ($1.4 million or 2 acres).

March 2005  Las Vegas Performing Arts Center Foundation enters into agreement with Donald W. Reynolds Foundation for $45 million endowment plus $5 million grant.

October 2005  The Related Companies pulls out of a deal to develop office space and residential high-rises in Union Park.

December 2005  City enters into agreement with Performing Arts Center Foundation.

November 2006  City Council approves Design Standards and Master Parcel Plan.
		
August 2007  Only project in Nevada accepted into Leadership in Energy and Environmental Design for Neighborhood Development (LEED®-ND) pilot program developed by the U.S. Green Building Council.

October 2007  The Smith Center for the Performing Arts receives $100 million challenge grant from the Donald W. Reynolds Foundation.

November 2007  City Council approves a $1.71 million agreement with the Whiting-Turner Contracting Company to handle pre-construction services for The Smith Center For The Performing Arts.

July 2008  Awarded Gold certification status under stage 2 by the U.S. Green Building Council (USGBC), through their Leadership in Energy and Environmental Design for Neighborhood Development (LEED®-ND) green building rating system.

Developments
In February 2006, the city entered into an agreement with Lou Ruvo Brain Institute. The Lou Ruvo Center for Brain Health started construction in 2007, and began seeing patients two years later. Chef Charlie Palmer also planned to open a hotel in Union Park, although the project has been delayed several times.

In May 2009, the city council approved a name change from Union Park to Symphony Park to reflect the significant role that the project would play as a cultural and artistic center. Construction also began on the Smith Center for the Performing Arts, which opened in March 2012. The Discovery Children's Museum relocated to Symphony Park one year later.

Otherwise, little development had taken place up to that point, with 90 percent of the property still vacant. The slow rate of development was blamed on the Great Recession. The Park Haven luxury apartment complex opened in May 2021, with 290 units.

Proposed downtown Las Vegas arena
In 2012, prior to the construction and opening of T-Mobile Arena, Las Vegas officials envisioned a $400 million arena with about 20,000 seats, large enough to house an NBA team, with additional retail throughout. It would have gone on the northeastern edge of Symphony Park, close to the Smith Center for the Performing Arts. The project was envisioned to be a private/public partnership between the city of Las Vegas and the Cordish Cos.

The project later morphed into a soccer stadium to attempt to attract a Major League Soccer franchise.

References

External links
Official website

 
Buildings and structures under construction in the United States